D121 is a state road connecting the island of Murter with D8 state road near Pirovac.

The southern terminus of the road is located in the town of Murter. The northern terminus is immediately to the south of Pirovac. The intersection with D8 state road, where D121 terminates, also represents the southern terminus of D59 state road to Knin.

The road crosses from the mainland to the Murter Island in Tisno via a movable bridge. The bridge is raised twice a day for 30 minutes to allow passage of vessels through the strait.

The road, as well as all other state roads in Croatia, is managed and maintained by Hrvatske ceste, a state-owned company.

Traffic volume 

Traffic is regularly counted and reported by Hrvatske ceste, operator of the road. Substantial variations between annual (AADT) and summer (ASDT) traffic volumes are attributed to the fact that the road serves as an approach to a number of resorts, carrying considerable tourist traffic.

Road junctions and populated areas

Sources

State roads in Croatia
Transport in Šibenik-Knin County